Hi'ya, Sailor is a 1943 American comedy film directed by Jean Yarbrough and written by Stanley Roberts. The film stars Donald Woods, Elyse Knox, Eddie Quillan, Frank Jenks, Phyllis Brooks and Jerome Cowan. The film was released on October 8, 1943, by Universal Pictures.

Plot

Cast
Donald Woods as Bob Jackson
Elyse Knox as Pat Rogers
Eddie Quillan as Corky Mills
Frank Jenks as Deadpan Weaver
Phyllis Brooks as Nanette
Jerome Cowan as Lou Asher
Matt Willis as Bull Rogan
Florence Lake as Secretary
Charles Coleman as Doorman
Mantan Moreland as Sam
Jack Mulhall as Police Lieutenant
Ray Eberle as himself
Wingy Manone as himself
The Delta Rhythm Boys as Themselves
Mayris Chaney as herself
Leo Diamond as himself
Eileen Nilsson as herself
Elsa Nilsson as herself

References

External links
 

1943 films
1940s English-language films
American comedy films
1943 comedy films
Universal Pictures films
Films directed by Jean Yarbrough
American black-and-white films
1940s American films